The railway vehicle owner's code formed part of the vehicle number on the side of a railway coach or wagon. Until 2005 it was used to specify the owner of the wagon. However, the owner code did not necessarily reflect ownership of a vehicle but rather who had the right to use it. Since then the owner code has been replaced by the UIC country code. The keeper of a vehicle is now indicated with a Vehicle Keeper Marking (VKM). The table shows the former numbers used.

*later attribution

References

External links 
 UIC 438 – 50 years of railway vehicle markings at dansk-jernbanearkiv.dk

Railway companies
Defunct railway companies
Rolling stock
International Union of Railways
Railway vehicles register numbers